The 2003 East Carolina Pirates football team was an American football team that represented East Carolina University as a member of Conference USA during the 2003 NCAA Division I-A football season. In their first season under head coach John Thompson, the team compiled a 1–11 record (1–7 in Conference USA).

Schedule

References

East Carolina
East Carolina Pirates football seasons
East Carolina Pirates football